The Makati Business Club is a private non-profit business association in the Philippines founded in 1981 to promote the role of the business sector in national development efforts.  Counting senior executives from some of the Philippines' largest corporations among its members, it pursues its objectives through four main lines of activity: policy advocacy, information services and publishing, investment promotion, and corporate citizenship.  It has played a key role in Philippine history, notably playing a key role in galvanizing the mainstream resistance against the Marcos Dictatorship and the Marcos family's later return to power.

See also 
 Makati Central Business District
 Bantayog ng mga Bayani
 Bernardo Villegas
 Alfonso Yuchengco
 Enrique Zobel

References 

Presidency of Ferdinand Marcos
Business organizations based in the Philippines